Platypthima is a genus of satyrid butterflies.

Species
Listed alphabetically:
Platypthima decolor Rothschild & Jordan, 1905
Platypthima dispar Joicey & Talbot, 1922
Platypthima homochroa (Rothschild & Jordan, 1907)
Platypthima klossi Rothschild & Durrant, 1915
Platypthima leucomelas (Rothschild, 1903)
Platypthima ornata Rothschild & Jordan, 1905
Platypthima pandora (Joicey & Talbot, 1916)
Platypthima placiva Jordan, 1924
Platypthima simplex Rothschild & Jordan, 1905

References

Satyrini
Butterfly genera